Digimon Adventure is a Japanese anime television series, the eighth incarnation of the Digimon franchise, and a reboot of the original 1999 anime television series of the same name. The series is animated by Toei Animation.

The anime adaptation of the series began airing on Fuji TV in Japan on April 5, 2020. Crunchyroll began streaming the series, starting on April 4. On April 19, Toei Animation announced that new episodes would be delayed due to the COVID-19 pandemic. Toei Animation later announced on June 19 that the series would resume broadcasting new episodes starting with Episode 4 on June 28 after episodes were rebroadcast from Episode 1 beginning June 7. 

The opening theme for the series is "Mikakunin Hikousen", performed by Takayoshi Tanimoto.

The first ending theme from episodes 1 to 13 is "Kuyashisa wa Tane", performed by Chiai Fujikawa. The second ending theme from episodes 14 to 26 is "Q?", performed by Reol. The third ending theme from episodes 27 to 38 is "Mind Game", performed by Maica_n. The fourth ending theme from episodes 39 to 54 is "Overseas Highway", performed by Wolpis Carter and Orangestar. The fifth and final ending theme from episodes 55 to 67 is "Dreamers", performed by Ateez.



Episode list

Notes

References 

Digimon Adventure (2020)
2020 Japanese television seasons
2021 Japanese television seasons
Adventure (2020)